The William Dixon Fowler House was built around 1901 in Spartanburg County, South Carolina by William Dixon Fowler. The Queen Anne style house is believed to have been built from plans published by prolific residential architect George F. Barber. The wood-frame house features a high level of carpentry and detailing. The house's chief features are a wrap-around porch, a porte-cochere, and a second-story turret embedded in the slope of the main roof. A contemporaneous smokehouse is also considered a contributing feature.

The Fowler House was listed on the National Register of Historic Places on February 8, 2012.

References

Houses completed in 1901
Houses in Spartanburg County, South Carolina
Houses on the National Register of Historic Places in South Carolina
National Register of Historic Places in Spartanburg County, South Carolina
Queen Anne architecture in South Carolina